Silverclaw (Maria De Guadalupe "Lupe" Santiago), is a fictional character, a superhero appearing in American comic books published by Marvel Comics. The character is depicted as a reserve member of the Avengers and regards Edwin Jarvis as an uncle figure.

Publication history

Silverclaw first appeared in Avengers vol. 3 #8 (September, 1998) and was created by writer Kurt Busiek and illustrator George Pérez.

Fictional character biography
Maria de Guadalupe Santiago was born near the village of the Kamekeri in the (fictional) South American nation of Costa Verde. The Kamekeri are a simple people whose ancestors worshipped the ancient gods until the arrival of the Spaniards. The Spanish missionaries helped to modernize the Kamekeri's lives and taught them their Christian beliefs. The conversion of the Kamekeri led to an abandonment of the ancient beliefs and gods. Legends say that the Kamekeri's gods left for the heavens, except for one. Peliali, the Volcano goddess, vowed to stay among her chosen people and to provide them with her protection.

Silverclaw's father, Jaime Santiago, was a Kamekeri villager who studied the ancient beliefs and pantheon. He traveled into the mountains where Peliali was said to dwell and returned with stories of encountering the volcano goddess. Santiago was ridiculed and denounced by the church for his reports of Peliali, but despite the mocking of the Kamekeri, he continued to visit her mountain. Months passed, and Santiago returned with an infant who he claimed was his daughter and the daughter of Peliali. The child was given a Christian name and baptized. During the baptism, little Lupe's ability to transform into were-forms manifested. Due to her bizarre and often uncontrolled transformations, she was the target of constant teasing and whispered fear from the Kamekeri.

As she grew up, Lupe's father taught her of her heritage and told her stories of her mother. But each time he would take her to visit Peliali's mountain home, there was no sign of the volcano goddess. When Lupe was still a child, her father died and she was taken in by the local church orphanage which was funded by ChildCare, an American charity for international orphans. The sisters that ran the orphanage were nervous about Lupe's strange powers and considered them ungodly. When Edwin Jarvis, the butler to Tony Stark and the world-famous Avengers, saw a commercial for the charitable organization ChildCare he decided to use part of his salary to sponsor a needy child. Jarvis wrote to ChildCare and was assigned to the orphanage in the Kamakeri village. The sisters at the orphanage had heard of Jarvis' employer and knew of his connection to Iron Man. Knowing this, they assigned Jarvis to be the sponsor of Lupe Santiago. They hoped that if any problems relating to Lupe's strange powers arose, Jarvis and his connections to the Avengers might help.

Over the years, Lupe wrote to Edwin Jarvis frequently and marveled at his tales of the Avengers, coming to regard him as an uncle of sorts. Lupe rejected her past and had a deep desire to be modern and worldly. She was always the first to try new things, like piercing her nose and buying CDs from America. She dreamed of visiting the US and attending University there. Despite all this, she never forgot her father's teachings and kept the ceremonial garb he designed for her as a reminder of her heritage and destiny.

Meeting the Avengers
Years later, Lupe journeyed to America to attend Empire State University and finally meet her "Tio Edwin".  En route, the plane Lupe was traveling on was hijacked by terrorists in the employ of Moses Magnum. Lupe uses her powers to try to stop the terrorists, but when they took hostages Silverclaw was forced into helping them. At the airport, Jarvis arrived to meet his long-time sponsored child. When the airport was attacked, he summons the Avengers. The Avengers arrived and battle Magnum's men who were being led by Silverclaw. After a brief tussle with Captain America and Triathlon, Silverclaw was defeated. However, the battle was merely a distraction and Magnum and his men managed to make good on their plans to steal a seismic cannon. Silverclaw quickly reappears and reveals herself to be Jarvis' ward. She explains she was forced into helping the terrorists. She accompanies the Avengers back to the mansion. Silverclaw helps the Avengers in stopping Magnum. She then began her studies at Empire State University, helping the Avengers when needed.

Kulan Gath
The second adventure was initiated by Silverclaw herself. Silverclaw receives an urgent message from Costa Verde. Fearing the worst, she sought the Avengers' help. The team accompanied her to Costa Verde and discovered Silverclaw's village had been conquered and transformed by Kulan Gath, an ancient wizard of the Hyborian age. Gath sought to increase his power by sacrificing a god...in this case, the goddess Peliali. Confronted with the reality of her mother's existence, Silverclaw and the Avengers - at the time consisting of the Wasp, Iron Man, She-Hulk, Warbird, Giant-Man, the Scarlet Witch and Triathlon- venture into the Kamekeri village which had been mystically transformed into a grand city from the Hyborian age. Kulan Gath's magic had transformed and ensorcelled the villagers, and it was only through the sorcerous aid of the Scarlet Witch, using communication chips from Iron Man's armor to focus her spell that the Avengers were able to infiltrate the city without being affected by the spell themselves. Having captured Peliali, Kulan Gath's plans were near fruition when the Avengers arrived. Kulan Gath's forces were easily able to overwhelm the assembled heroes who were captured and forced to watch as Kulan Gath performed the ceremony necessary to kill Peliali. With her death, Kulan Gath intended to open a gate to the nether realms where he would ascend to power with Peliali's life as the toll for his passage into power.

Using the electrically charged weapons of the guards to provide Warbird with a power boost, the Avengers were able to free themselves. Silverclaw attacks Kulan Gath, but soon realizes her only hope is Peliali herself. Seeking to increase her mother's power to enable her to escape Kulan Gath, Lupe appeals to the Kamekeri in an attempt to restore their faith in Peliali. Her efforts succeed and Peliali escapes Gath's initial murder attempt. Gath's dark masters claim Gath instead and the village is restored. Peliali did not fare quite so well as her beloved village. Gath's blow hadn't killed her directly but was soon fatal. Silverclaw gets a chance to say goodbye before Peliali dies.

Silverclaw returns to the ESU and focuses on studying topics she believes will help her people. The Scarlet Witch offers her an Avengers reserve slot. Silverclaw accepts the membership and joins the Avengers in responding to the Maximum Security crisis and the Kang War; on one occasion she even held her own against Diablo when he attacked a nearby building while the other Avengers were away in Greece, keeping him busy until Wonder Man and Triathlon arrived and helped her to disarm him. During the Kang War, she fought alongside Yellowjacket and Quicksilver under the command of Warbird in launching an attack to acquire the technology of the self-proclaimed Master of the World, Quicksilver commenting that she reminded him of his sister, the Scarlet Witch, back when Wanda was Silverclaw's age.

Silverclaw was also in the Avengers: Celestial Quest eight issue limited series. (November 2001 - June 2002).

Civil War
Silverclaw was seen fighting Ms. Marvel, who was attempting to get her to join the heroes supporting the Superhuman Registration Act during the Civil War. Silverclaw was vehemently against the SHRA because as she says it is not the law in her country. As a result, a pitched battle between the two occurred. It is later confirmed that she was captured. Tony Stark states that despite her tenure with the Avengers, he does not consider Silverclaw a likely participant in the 50 States Initiative, given her original resistance to the SHRA and her status as a citizen of another country.

Silverclaw,  along with fellow superheroes Dusk, Tigra, Stature, and Araña, was next seen captured by the Puppet Master. She was subsequently freed by Ms. Marvel.

Powers and abilities
Silverclaw possesses the superhuman ability to mimic the physical characteristics of various animals native to rainforests and jungles. Thus far, Lupe has demonstrated the following animal aspects: jaguar, anaconda, cockatoo, monkey, sloth, puma, cheetah, and crocodile. When assuming an animal form, Lupe does not transform fully into the animal. Instead, she assumes a form that combines elements of the animal with her normal human appearance. These were-forms are similar to the transitional forms assumed by other animal shape-shifters, such as the mutants Wolfsbane and Catseye. Each of these forms grant Silverclaw additional abilities. Silverclaw has demonstrated enhanced strength, speed and agility, claws, flight and enhanced senses while transformed. She has also shown the ability to alter her size to some degree, as when she transformed into a giant sloth.

In her powered form, Silverclaw's skin assumes a silvery quality. This silver skin also manifests whenever Silverclaw assumes an animal form. It has not been revealed if Lupe's silver skin is merely cosmetic or if it possesses superhuman qualities of its own. As a shape-shifter, Lupe has complete control of her form. Through force of will, she has overcome powerful transformative enchantments and reverted to her true form, such as when Diablo attempted to turn her into salt.

Reception

Newsarama ranked Silverclaw as the sixth worst Avengers member describing her story as "a little better than Triathlon's, but the character was infinitely lamer" and that she had the power to "dress like an extra from a Tarzan film".

References

Avengers (comics) characters
Characters created by Kurt Busiek
Comics characters introduced in 1998
Fictional characters with superhuman senses
Fictional Hispanic and Latino American people
Fictional werecats
Latin American superheroes
Marvel Comics characters who are shapeshifters
Marvel Comics characters with superhuman strength
Marvel Comics female superheroes
Marvel Comics orphans